Colin Fowles (6 August 1953 − 1 September 1985) was a Jamaican-American soccer player who died as a result of random gunfire while playing recreational soccer.  He played professionally in the North American Soccer League and United Soccer League.

Youth
Fowles attended Long Island University-Brooklyn from 1972 to 1975 where he played forward on the men's soccer team.  He scored  24 goals over his four seasons with the team.

Professional
In 1976, he was taken by the Tampa Bay Rowdies as the 19th overall pick of the North American Soccer League draft.  In 1977, the Fort Lauderdale Strikers signed Fowles for the team's first season.  He played with the team through 1983, its last season in Fort Lauderdale.  Over his seven seasons with the Strikers, he played 140 games and scored six goals.  After the Strikers moved to Minnesota in 1984, Fowles remained in Florida and played for the Fort Lauderdale Sun of the United Soccer League.  In 1985, the Sun was renamed the South Florida Sun, but the team and the league folded after only six games into the season.  Fowles was known as the fastest player in the NASL.  He once raced a quarterhorse over 80 yards and won.

National team
Fowles earned his first cap when he came on for Gary Etherington in a 2-1 victory over El Salvador on 15 September 1977.  He played all eight U.S. games that year at forward, but never found the net.   Beginning in 1978, the U.S. coaching staff moved Fowles to defense where he played all three games that year.  He continued to play sporadically through 1979 and 1980 with his last cap coming in the last U.S. game of 1980.  Fowled earned a total of 18 caps, between 1977 and 1980, but scored no goals.

Death
Colin continued to live in the Coral Springs Florida area after playing professional soccer.  He coached St.Thomas Aquinas HS soccer team and played with the Lauderhill Men's Soccer Club.  On 28 August 1985, he was playing in the league championship at a Park in Miami and a gang war broke out behind the goal during the game. Multiple people were shot and killed right behind the goal. After the initial shooting was over, some of the assailants tried to blend in with the crowd outside the park as fans scrambled for safety. One of the men involved in the argument pulled a gun as Colin approached him and shot multiple times at Colin and missed. Colin jumped behind a telephone pole as the shooter approached the pole and shot Colin point blank in the midsection. The ambulance that came to take him the hospital had mechanical failure and another ambulance was dispatched. Later Colin was pronounced dead at the hospital. 

The Florida Sun posthumously inducted Fowles into its Hall of Fame in 1986.

References

External links
 NASL stats

1985 deaths
Sportspeople from Kingston, Jamaica
American soccer players
Jamaican emigrants to the United States
Tampa Bay Rowdies (1975–1993) players
Tampa Bay Rowdies draft picks
Fort Lauderdale Strikers (1977–1983) players
Fort Lauderdale Sun players
North American Soccer League (1968–1984) indoor players
North American Soccer League (1968–1984) players
United Soccer League (1984–85) players
United States men's international soccer players
Deaths by firearm in Florida
1953 births
Association football forwards
Association football defenders